Eleocharis jacobsiana is a sedge of the family Cyperaceae that is native to Western Australia.

The species was first described in 2011 by Karen Wilson, who gave it the species epithet, jacobsiana, to honour Surrey Wilfrid Laurence Jacobs.

References

Plants described in 2011
Flora of Western Australia
jacobsiana
Taxa named by Karen Louise Wilson